Asterivora ministra is a species of moth in the family Choreutidae. It is endemic to New Zealand and has been observed at Mount Holdsworth and Mount Arthur. This species inhabits alpine native herbage above the tree line. The adults are on the wing in February.

Taxonomy 
This species was first described by Edward Meyrick, using specimens collected by George Hudson at Mount Holdsworth, and named Simaethis ministra. In 1928 George Hudson discussed this species under that name in his book The butterflies and moths of New Zealand. In 1979 J. S. Dugdale placed this species within the genus Asterivora. In 1988 Dugdale confirmed this placement. The male holotype specimen, collected at Mount Holdsworth, is held at the Natural History Museum, London.

Description 
 
Meyrick described this species as follows:

This species is very similar in appearance to A. microlitha and analoga. A. ministra can be distinguished as its antennae are fully dark fuscous, it has broader forewings with costa more arched and less defined white markings while on the hindwings, the white streak is broader and less defined.

Distribution 
This species is endemic to New Zealand. Along with the type locality of Mount Holdsworth in Wellington, this species has also been collected at Mount Arthur.

Habitat 
It inhabits alpine native herbage above the tree line.

Behaviour 
The adults of this species is on the wing in February.

References

Asterivora
Moths of New Zealand
Moths described in 1912
Endemic fauna of New Zealand
Taxa named by Edward Meyrick
Endemic moths of New Zealand